Pierina Sara Mercedes Correa Delgado (born 30 May 1961) is an Ecuadorian architect and politician, sister of the former president of Ecuador Rafael Correa and a National Assembly member for Union for Hope.

Biography
Correa was born in Guayaquil. Her father was Rafael Correa Icaza, born in Los Ríos Province on 23 March 1935. Her mother is Norma Delgado Rendón, also from the Vinces Canton (Los Ríos Province), born on 1 September 1939. Correa has three other siblings: Fabricio, Rafael and Bernarda Correa. She graduated in 2002 as an architect from the Universidad Católica de Santiago de Guayaquil, and also has a Master's Degree in High Performance Sports from the Universidad Católica San Antonio de Murcia and the Spanish Olympic Committee.

Political career
In 2009, Correa was an unsuccessful candidate for the Prefect of Guayas by the PAIS Alliance. In 2019, she was a candidate for Prefect of Guayas for the Social Commitment Force in the 2019 Guayas provincial elections, where she was second with 17.4% of the votes.

In 2011, Correa was elected president of the Guayas Sports Federation (FEDEGUAYAS), as representative of Ministry of Health. However, she was dismissed from her position in January 2019 by the Sports Secretariat, because the poor state of the sports venues managed by the entity.

Correa was a candidate for the National Assembly in the 2021 legislative elections, where she topped the list of national assemblymen for the Union for Hope.

References

1961 births
Living people
People from Guayaquil
Ecuadorian women architects
PAIS Alliance politicians
Members of the National Assembly (Ecuador)
21st-century Ecuadorian women politicians
21st-century Ecuadorian politicians
Women members of the National Assembly (Ecuador)